Tobago FA Cup  is the foremost association football tournament in Tobago, Trinidad and Tobago.

Previous winners
2000 : Grafton Stokely Vale   2-1 King David Enterprise Goal City
2001 : Charlotteville Unifiers 
2002 : FC Phoenix             1-1 St. Clair's C.S.        [5-4 pen]      
2003 : Stokely Vale           2-1 Georgia                 [asdet]
2004 : St. Clair's C.S.       2-0 Sidey's FC
2005 : Roxborough Lakers      3-2 Pepsi Hills United    
2006 : St. Clair's C.S.       4-1 Charlotteville Unifiers
2007 : Roxborough Lakers
2008 : Roxborough Lakers      4-1 Charlotteville Unifiers
2009 : Stokely Vale           2-0 1976 Phoenix

References 

Football cup competitions in Trinidad and Tobago
Tobago